Agnew v Commissioners of Inland Revenue, more commonly referred to as  is a decision of the Privy Council relating to New Zealand and UK insolvency law, concerning the taking of a security interest over a company's assets, the proper characterisation of a floating charge, and the priority of creditors in a company winding-up.

Facts
Brumark Investments Ltd gave security over debts to its bank, Westpac. The terms were that its security was a fixed charge, but a floating charge when proceeds were collected (the same as drafted as in Re New Bullas Trading Ltd). Brumark was free to collect debts for its own account and to use proceeds in its business. Brumark went into receivership. The receivers collected the outstanding debts.

Fisher J held that uncollected debts were subject to a fixed charge, as the parties had agreed. So they were not subject to claims of preferential creditors. The NZ Court of Appeal overturned this and held that the fact Brumark could collect the debts for its own account (and hence remove them from the bank's security) made it a floating charge. So the preferential creditors had a prior claim.

Advice
The Privy Council advised that it was indeed a floating charge. It said the court's task is not to ask whether the parties intended to create a fixed or floating charge, but to ask what rights the parties intended to create, and then decide as a matter of law whether it is fixed or floating. Lord Millett held that Nourse LJ's approach in New Bullas based on freedom of contract was 'fundamentally mistaken'. The process of construction required assessing what was intended, but this meant looking at the substance of the transaction, not its form. He noted that in Siebe Gorman & Co Ltd v Barclays Bank Ltd and In re Keenan Bros Ltd the proceeds of the book debts were not at the free disposal of the company - that is why these were fixed charges - the proceeds were not available to the company as a source of its cash flow.

See also

UK insolvency law

Notes

References

United Kingdom company case law
United Kingdom insolvency case law
2001 in case law
Judicial Committee of the Privy Council cases on appeal from New Zealand
2001 in New Zealand law